Nico Wiener (born 15 March 1997) is an Austrian archer competing in compound events. He won the gold medal in the men's individual compound event at the 2021 World Archery Championships held in Yankton, United States. He also won the bronze medal in the men's team compound event.

In 2015, he competed in the men's individual compound and men's team compound events at the World Archery Championships held in Copenhagen, Denmark.

He won the bronze medal in the men's team compound event at the 2022 European Archery Championships held in Munich, Germany.

He represented Austria at the 2022 World Games held in Birmingham, United States. He competed in the men's individual compound event.

References

External links
 

Living people
1997 births
Place of birth missing (living people)
Austrian male archers
World Archery Championships medalists
Competitors at the 2022 World Games
21st-century Austrian people